Filodes fulvidorsalis is a moth in the family Crambidae. It was described by Carl Geyer in 1832. It is found on Java and Seram.

References

Moths described in 1832
Spilomelinae
Moths of Indonesia